John II van de Werve (Antwerp, 1522–1576), Lord of Hovorst, Vierseldijk and Boechout was a member of the nobility and of the civic government of Antwerp.

Family 

John III was the son of Gerald van de Werve, 5th Lord of Hovorst. He married three times with ladies of noble birth: 2nd with Claire Rockox.
His uncle Martin was married to Mary of Ursel, sister of his brother-in-law: Lancelot II of Ursel. He became the uncle of Nicolaas II Rockox and Jacobus Dassa, all mayors of Antwerp. His final marriage was to Margareth van Baexem van Achterluyten. He was succeeded as Lord of Hovorst by his son John IV van de Werve, who died in 1622.

Career 
Van de Werve studied canon law, and followed his father in a career of service to the city of Antwerp, serving numerous terms as an alderman between 1533 and 1570. During the Sack of Antwerp by Spanish mutineers from the Army of Flanders, Van de Werve tried to defend Antwerp City Hall form destruction. His was one of the 7,000 lives that were lost in the sack.

Author 
He wrote a Dutch dictionary, Den schat der Duytscher talen, which was first published in 1553 and went through many editions.

See also
John I van de Werve , Mayor of Antwerp.

References

External links
Den schat der Duytscher talen, 1614 edition, on Google Books.

People from Antwerp
John
John
Nobility of the Spanish Netherlands
1522 births
1576 deaths